Sound Horizon is a Japanese symphonic rock musical group with composer  as the leader and only permanent member. They describe themselves as a "fantasy band" and have released works that closely resemble classical suites. Their songs often revolve around historical events and classic fairytales. When creating music based on other people's stories, the band uses the name Linked Horizon.

History

Sound Horizon began with Revo releasing his music creations on the internet on his website in the late 1990s. In 2001, Sound Horizon participated in Comic Market as part of a dōjin music circle and released their first story CD, Chronicle, an all-instrumental track CD, with occasional narration, background chorus and sound effects. The inclusion of actual singing began from their second release (Thanatos) onwards. Their subsequent works were released at Comic Market and M3.

Sound Horizon's first major release was in 2004, with the album Elysion ~Rakuen e no Zensōkyoku~ (lit. Elysion ~Prelude to Paradise~). Their first maxi-single, "Shōnen wa Tsurugi o...", which was released in 2006, includes "Shūtan no Ou to Isekai no Kishi ~The Endia & The Knights~", the theme for the PlayStation 2 simulation RPG Chaos Wars, and "Kamigami ga Aishita Rakuen ~Belle Isle~", the opening theme for the MMORPG Belle Isle.

Although Aramary was their main female singer through the Elysion album, her departure afterward led Sound Horizon's style to shift quite a bit, to having many vocalists, rather than just one main female one (previously Aramary) and one main male vocalist (Jimang). Revo himself also tended to sing more often in the later albums, beginning with Roman.

On September 3, 2008, Sound Horizon released the album Moira. The album featured Takashi Utsunomiya of TM Network as one of the vocalists. Moira debuted at No. 3 on the Oricon weekly album charts, selling over 45,000 copies in its initial week.

Sound Horizon released the single "Ido e Itaru Mori e Itaru Ido" on June 16, 2010. The single featured guitarist Marty Friedman and Vocaloid Hatsune Miku, along with a beta voicebank for Vocaloid known as "Junger März PROTOTYPE β".

In 2012, Revo began a new project called Linked Horizon, beginning with his work on the score for the Nintendo 3DS game Bravely Default: Flying Fairy, a series of EPs and album. In 2013 and subsequent years, Linked Horizon performed the first, second, third and fifth opening themes, as well as the fourth ending theme, for the anime adaptation of Attack on Titan along with a series of EPs and albums.

In June 2014, Revo also composed the first opening theme of Sailor Moon Crystal, "Moon Pride".

Band members

Discography
Sound Horizon's main albums are called 'Stories' or 'Horizons' and are numbered, starting with Chronicle.

Pico Magic, Pico Magic Reloaded, Elysion ~Rakuen e no Zensōkyoku~ and Chronology are compilation albums and are not counted as story albums.

Chronicle 2nd is an expanded reissue of the first Chronicle album.

The ninth story Nein was released in 2015, even though the eight story, with the working title Rinne, hasn't been released yet.

Doujin albums

Sound Horizon major releases

Albums

Singles

Live recordings
Story Concerts are a type of theatre concerts, that each reproduce a Story Album on stage, with the singers all in costumes and acting their roles in addition to singing.

(This list does not include live recordings released as extra content with albums)

Linked Horizon

Albums

Singles

Live recordings

Revo

Awards and nominations

References

External links

Revo's blog

Sound Horizon discography at Discogs
Sound Horizon discography on iTunes
Linked Horizon discography at Discogs
Linked Horizon discography on iTunes
Revo discography at Discogs
Revo discography on iTunes

2001 establishments in Japan
Crunchyroll Anime Awards winners
Doujin music
Japanese progressive metal musical groups
Japanese progressive rock groups
Japanese symphonic metal musical groups
Musical groups established in 2001
Pony Canyon artists